Barouéli Cercle is an administrative subdivision of the Ségou Region of Mali. The administrative center (chef-lieu) is the town of Barouéli.

The Cercle is divided into 11 communes:

Barouéli
Boidié
Dougoufié
Gouendo
Kalaké
Konobougou
N'Gassola
Sanando
Somo
Tamani
Tesserla

References

Cercles of Mali
Ségou Region